Miss USA 1954 was the 3rd Miss USA pageant, held on July 24, 1954 at Long Beach Municipal Auditorium, Long Beach, California. Miriam Stevenson, won the competition and later became Miss Universe. She was crowned by outgoing titleholder Myrna Hansen of Illinois.

Placements

Placements

Contestants

44 contestants competed for the title.

Notes

External links
Miss USA official website

1954
1954 in the United States
1954 beauty pageants
1954 in California
1954